The Province of Perugia is the larger of the two provinces in the Umbria region of Italy, comprising two-thirds of both the area and population of the region. Its capital is the city of Perugia. The province covered all of Umbria until 1927, when the province of Terni was carved out of its southern third. The province of Perugia has an area of 6,334 km² covering two-thirds of Umbria, and a total population of about 660,000. There are 59 comunes in the province. The province has numerous tourist attractions, especially artistic and historical ones, and is home to the Lake Trasimeno, the largest lake of Central Italy. It is historically the ancestral origin of the Umbri, while later it was a Roman province and then part of the Papal States until the late 19th century.

History and topology 

The Etruscans likely founded Perugia in the 6th century BC. The Umbra and Tiber valleys are located in the province. The eastern part of the province is a hilly region while the rest was covered by forests. The province lies in the basin of the river Tiber and its tributaries Chiaseio, Nestore, Naja and Chiana. 
The southern regions are less hilly. Silk, corn and grass are some of the most important agricultural products of the province. 
The 1840 version of the Penny Cyclopaedia records that Perugia supplied almost half of the butcher's meat required in the city of Rome. 
The large number of cattle was fed on grass growing on the plain areas irrigated by the water of Tiber and its tributaries. After the province of Rome, Viterbo and Spoleto e Rieti the Perugian province was the fourth most important of the Papal States. 
The largest lake in central Italy, Lake Trasimeno is located in the Province of Perugia. The lake has three islands – Polvese, Maggiore and Minore. The lake has a circumference of about 30 miles but is relatively shallow. 
It is fed by springs in the nearby hills.

Perugia was incorporated into the Kingdom of Italy in 1860, as the Province of Umbria.
The Province of Umbria at the time was somewhat larger than the current region of Umbria, comprising Rieti to the south (now part of  Lazio). It was subdivided into the districts (circondari) of Perugia, Foligno, Orvieto, Terni, Rieti and Spoleto. 
In 1921, the municipal council of Terni proposed the separation of the province into the new provinces of Perugia and Terni. In 1923, Rieti together with Cittaducale were added to the province of Rome (Lazio). The remaining Province of Umbria was divided into the Provinces of Perugia and Terni in 1927.

Administration 

The 59 comunes in the province of Perugia are administered by an elected local authority which is responsible for regional planning, managing and addressing municipalities activities, environment, energy, road maintenance etc. In 2007, 25 people died of consequences of drug overdose in the province of Perugia. This was the highest number of deaths recorded due to drug overdose in any Italian province.

Tourist attractions 

The province is well known for its medieval palaces, castles and fortresses. A few important tourist destinations of the province are the Roman amphitheatre near Porta Marzia, Cassero di Porta Sant'Angelo, Palazzo del Capitano del Popolo, Cathedral of San Lorenzo, San Bernardino's Pulpit, Piazza IV Novembre,  Maggiore Fountain, National Gallery of Umbria, National Museum of Umbrian Archaeology and St. Peter's bell tower in the city of Perugia; Basilica of Saint Claire, Upper Basilica of St. Francis, Temple of Minerva (dates back to 1st century B.C.) and Basilica of Santa Maria Degli Angeli in Assisi; Church of Sant'Agostino, Church of Saint Francis and Montefalco hill in Spello; the 14th century fortress Rocca Albornonziana, Arco di Druso and Bridge of Towers in Spoleto; Piazza del Popolo, Palazzo del Capitano and Roman Etruscan Museum in Todi; Cathedral of Santa Maria Argentea in Norcia. The first Christian monk Saint Benedict was born in Norcia. The town of Gubbio has a Roman theater which dates back to 1st century A.D.. Franciscan Path of Peace which was the path traversed by Saint Francis who left all the property he inherited from his father, connects Assisi with Gubbio. Assisi is an UNESCO World Heritage Site. The cultural festival named "Festival dei due Mondi" held in Spoleto; Festival of the Ceri involving a candle procession to the nearby Basilica of San Ubaldo and a cross bow contest "Cross-Bow Palio" in Gubbio also attract large number of tourists. The province is also known for its cuisine which includes black truffles, Easter Pizza, lentils from Castelluccio and Salami and cold cuts from Norcia.

Main cities 

The principal towns in the province, with a population over 20,000, are:

See also 

 Comuni of the Province of Perugia

Gallery

References 

 
Perugia